Alex Hunter is a fictional character in the FIFA game series made by EA Sports. He is played by actor Adetomiwa Edun, who provided the voice and motion capture for the character.

Background
Alex Hunter was born in Clapham, London on November 27, 1999. He played youth football on Clapham Common with best friend Gareth Walker. Hunter is multiracial, with a white father and black mother. His life goal is to play as a professional footballer. His grandfather, Jim Hunter, was a former player who scored 22 goals in the 1968–69 season. Alex's father, Harold, was also a football player in his youth, but his career was cut short due to an injury.

Appearances

FIFA 17

Following a cup final game between two young teams, one of which features Hunter and his best friend, Gareth Walker, either Walker or Hunter score the winning penalty in a penalty shoot-out, a scout remarks about Alex Hunter's talent to Jim Hunter. Seven years later, Hunter and Walker are invited to an exit trial for youth not yet signed to professional contracts. After a successful trial, Hunter signs for any Premier League club of the player's choosing. Hunter soon learns that Walker has joined the same club.

Both players attend the club's pre-season tour of the United States, in which they play against Real Madrid, Borussia Dortmund and Paris Saint-Germain. In the regular season, after starting most games as a substitute, Hunter's club signs one of Harry Kane or Ángel Di María, and Hunter is loaned out to either Newcastle United or Aston Villa, or Norwich City. After impressing on loan in the Championship, Hunter returns to his parent club only to find that Walker has left for the club's Premier League rival.

Hunter is able to receive sponsorship deals from Adidas, each deal being received whenever Hunter hits a milestone number of followers in the Twitter-based social media menu of the game mode. The deals include new boots, a photoshoot, and the chance to appear in an Adidas advertisement alongside Di María. After a successful season in the starting eleven, Hunter gets to start in the final of the FA Cup, in which he faces Gareth Walker for the first or second time since his departure from the club. Before the game, Hunter and Walker encounter each other in the tunnel. Regardless of the result, Walker and Hunter shake hands after the game and they reconcile. Later, in Hunter's flat, Hunter discovers that he has been named on a long-list of players to be called up to the England national team.

FIFA 18

Following a successful debut season, Hunter returns as a well-known professional footballer and wants to make his mark at international level. Hunter and his friend Danny Williams, who were teammates in the Championship, play against some Brazilian children in a 3v3 football game while on holiday. After returning home to England, Hunter is invited to have an interview with Rio Ferdinand. He runs into Walker, who mocks that Hunter is still with his agent, Michael. At a pre-season tour in Los Angeles, Hunter's team plays against Real Madrid; regardless of the result, Hunter swaps jerseys with Cristiano Ronaldo, who suggests that Hunter should play for Madrid. If the player beats Real Madrid, Hunter next plays against LA Galaxy, where Hunter encounters Gyasi Zardes in the tunnel before the game. Hunter also meets his father during the tour, and begrudgingly accepts an invitation to have dinner with him. After the tour, Hunter and his teammates go to Chicago where they participate in the MLS All-Star Game.

Following the first game of the new Premier League season, Michael tells Hunter that Real Madrid are interested in him, and Hunter submits a transfer request. Following this news, Hunter's teammates and his fans lose faith in his commitment to the team. The day before the transfer window closes, Michael reveals that he found out that the Real Madrid deal was a scam. Despite explaining the situation to the club's executive, Hunter is moved to the youth squad. On deadline day, Michael admits that he really wanted Hunter to sign with Madrid to boost his reputation as an agent. Hunter is enraged at Michael for gambling his football career for his personal gain, and can either forgive him or fire him. Hunter then gets a call from his father, now working for LA Galaxy, who offer him a contract, which Hunter accepts.

While in the U.S., Hunter learns that he has a half-sister, Kim. Though furious with his father, Hunter supports Kim during her international debut on the U.S. soccer team against Germany. Hunter returns home to England after the season with LA ends at Christmas, but gives Kim their grandfather's football for luck in her future games.

After reuniting with Danny, who signed with Hunter's former club when he left, Hunter learns that Atletico Madrid, PSG, and Bayern Munich are interested in signing him. He signs to one of them and when he arrives, he finds out that Dino, the manager of his former loan club, is at his new club as well. Dino pairs Hunter up with either Thomas Muller or Antoine Griezmann, or Dele Alli, the player serving as Hunter's strike partner. However, Hunter suffers a knee injury early in the season that sidelines him for most of the season.

Once recovered, Hunter finds out that Dino's job is at risk, and he may be fired if the club doesn't win any silverware by the season's end. If Hunter plays well and wins the league or domestic cup, Dino keeps his job; if not, he is fired. After the season ends, Hunter takes Jim over to the United States to meet Kim. After the meal, Hunter receives a call from an agent, offering to make him an icon.

FIFA 19

The story starts out with both Alex Hunter, his half-sister Kim and Danny Williams watching a video of Hunter's grandfather, Jim Hunter, scoring his 100th career goal for his club in a First Division match at Coventry City. After that, they train with their respective teams for the pre-season friendly tournament which is being held in Japan - ending with Alex and Danny's teams facing each other in the tournament's final. Alex later meets with Beatriz Villanova, the football agent that contacted him at the end of the previous journey - promising to make Alex an icon in world football. She keeps her promise and tells Alex that Real Madrid have offered him a 5-year contract, which he accepts and heads over to Spain to his new club. Alex is yet to make his Champions League debut and gets help from various mentors in the team to help him boost his stats.

Both Alex and Danny's teams make it out of their groups in the Champions League and are drawn at opposite ends of the bracket. By this point Alex has become increasingly caught up in his brand and sponsor duties from his agents demands and the increasing fame is starting to drive a wedge between his family. This is further seen when Kim comes to visit Alex before the World Cup and Alex doesn't go to pick her up from the airport due to him being too busy with his new clothing brand, much to both Kim and his mother's dismay. Due to this, Alex is dropped from both the starting XI and substitutes before the first knockout game in the Champions League, meaning he has to fight his way back to the starting lineup to regain his manager's trust. Meanwhile, Danny is also having agent issues as his friend Ringo and his agent, Michael, have an argument over him wanting a new house or not, with the player given a choice as to which person he sides with. Nevertheless, both their teams make it to the semi-finals of the competition. Alex and Beatriz then go to visit Kim before the first knockout game and Beatriz, having been impressed by Kim's abilities, tells her that she should go pro and not go to college. Back in the Champions League, Alex faces Juventus and Danny once again face his brother's side. Both defeat their rivals and progress to the Champions League Final. In the 2019 Champions League final at the Wanda Metropolitano in Madrid where Real Madrid face Danny's Premier League side. Regardless of who wins the final, the losing character takes their defeat graciously as the other celebrates being crowned the best club team in Europe. The game ends with Jim telling Alex that he has never been prouder of him and that when he retires, he will be the greatest Hunter of all time, drawing Alex Hunter's journey to an end.

FIFA 20

Alex Hunter and Danny Williams are mentioned to have played Street Football in Rio de Janeiro in the game's Volta Football Story mode. Hunter attends the NYC Pro Street Invitational with Beatriz Villanova in New York and takes a selfie with Syd, Revvy's (the Protagonist) teammate.

Reception and impact
Alex Hunter's story was heavily linked with the story of Manchester United forward Marcus Rashford, who scored twice on his debut in February 2016. Rashford also gave his thoughts on the similarities between him and Alex Hunter before England's game against Iceland during Euro 2016: "I actually can't believe how accurate it is, watching Alex, it reminds me of my journey."

It is not possible to customize anything about Hunter other than his team, position, and clothing, unlike FIFAs "Career mode" where users can create a player based on their own likeness. The lack of customization created minor backlash online, though research by Vocativ found most complaints about the lack of customization were not racially motivated.

References

Fictional English people
Fictional association football players
Fictional British people in video games
Fictional Black British people
Video game characters introduced in 2016
Male characters in video games
Video game protagonists
Association football video games
EA Sports games
Electronic Arts games
FIFA (video game series)